Stephen London is the eleventh and current bishop of the Anglican Diocese of Edmonton, having been elected in 2021.

Life and career
London was born in 1973 in McKinney, Texas in the United States. He earned a Master of Divinity from Yale University Divinity School, and was ordained as a deacon in the Episcopal Diocese of Connecticut by Andrew Smith. In 2004 he moved to Canada, and on March 21, 2004, was ordained a priest for the Diocese of Edmonton by Victoria Matthews. He served as rector of St. Michael and All Angels in Edmonton from 2004-2012, and as rector of St. Thomas in Sherwood Park from 2012-2021. During his time as a priest in the Diocese of Edmonton, London served on various ecumenical committees, including with the Lutheran, Roman Catholic, and Moravian churches.

He is married to the Rev. Stephanie London, also an Anglican priest and rector of St. Columba's Anglican Church in Beaumont, Alberta. They have three children.

In June 2021, London was elected from a pool of eight candidates as the eleventh bishop of the Diocese of Edmonton, succeeding Jane Alexander. He was consecrated a bishop on September 18, 2021, with Greg Kerr-Wilson, the Archbishop of Calgary being the principal consecrating bishop. Archbishops Linda Nicholls, Primate of the Anglican Church of Canada, and Mark MacDonald, National Indigenous Anglican Archbishop, were present. Due to the COVID-19 pandemic, the service was only open to a limited number of people.

References

Date of birth missing (living people)
Living people
Yale Divinity School alumni
Anglican bishops of Edmonton
21st-century Anglican Church of Canada bishops
Year of birth missing (living people)